In Unix and Unix-like operating systems, printf ("print formatted") is a shell builtin (and utility program) that formats and prints data.

The command accepts a printf format string, which specifies methods for formatting items, and a list of items to be formatted. Named historically after the intention of printing to a printer, it now actually outputs to stdout. Characters in the format string are copied to the output or, if a % is encountered, are used to format an item. In addition to the standard formats, %b causes printf to expand backslash escape sequences (for example \n for newline), and %q outputs an item that can be used as shell input. The format string is reused if there are more items than format specs. Unused format specs provide a zero value or null string.

History 
 is part of the X/Open Portability Guide since issue 4 of 1992. It was inherited into the first version of POSIX.1 and the Single Unix Specification. It first appeared in 4.3BSD-Reno.

The version of printf bundled in GNU coreutils was written by David MacKenzie. It has an extension  for escaping strings in POSIX-shell format.

Examples
$ for NUMBER in  4 6 8 9 10
> do printf " >> %03d %d<< \n" $NUMBER $RANDOM
> done
 >> 004 26305<<
 >> 006 6687<<
 >> 008 20170<<
 >> 009 28322<<
 >> 010 4400<<

This will print a directory listing, emulating 'ls': 
printf "%s\n" *

See also
 printf, the C function

References

External links

Standard Unix programs
IBM i Qshell commands